Manon Clayes (born in Maldegem on January 3, 1986) is a Paralympic equestrian of Belgium. She broke her neck and three vertebrae in her back in a horse-riding accident on Friday the 13th, April 2007. As a result of the accident, she sustained nerve damage on her right side and has only 30% power on that side of her body. She participated at the 2020 Summer Paralympics and won a bronze medal in both the Championship IV and Freestyle IV  dressage competitions.

References 

Paralympic equestrians of Belgium
Equestrians at the 2020 Summer Paralympics
1986 births
Belgian female equestrians
Living people
Medalists at the 2020 Summer Paralympics
Paralympic medalists in equestrian
Paralympic bronze medalists for Belgium
People from Maldegem
Sportspeople from East Flanders
21st-century Belgian women